Marcel Reif (born 27 November 1949) is a Swiss television sport journalist and commentator

Biography 

Reif was born in Wałbrzych, Silesia (formerly Waldenburg), four years after the area was transferred to Poland from Germany following World War II. In 1956 his family moved to Tel Aviv; his father was a Polish Jew, while his mother was a German Catholic. Reif only learned to speak German at the age of eight, after his family moved again to Kaiserslautern.

Reif has been working for many years in German television as a journalist for sport programs on German broadcasters RTL and ZDF. After leaving RTL in 1999, he joined Sky Deutschland, which at that time was called "Premiere". Reif has been the head of the commentator staff for many years. 

He lives in Zürich, Switzerland and has three children. He married twice. In 2013, he acquired Swiss citizenship and dispensed with his German one.

Awards 

 2003: Adolf-Grimme-Preis
 2002: Deutscher Fernsehpreis

External links 

Official website

Der Damit-kann-ich-leben-Mann, Die Zeit, 13 March 2003 (in German)

German sports journalists
German sports broadcasters
German male journalists
1949 births
Living people
Academic staff of the Technical University of Munich
German people of Polish-Jewish descent
ZDF people
RTL Group people